Pirujali Union is a union parishad under Gazipur Sadar Upazila, Gazipur District, Bangladesh.

Administration
Pirujali Union is located near Dhaka-Mymensingh highway. This is a small Union with 10 villages in it. This union has 2 Secondary School, 6 primary school, 4 madrasa one of which is of degree level and more than 40 mosques in it. Some of the villages, are:
Borta Para
Sorkar Para
Alim Para
Master Para
Moddhopara
 Bokchar para

Education
Pirujali Union, previously known as Pirujali Village is one of the most educated villages in Gazipur. This union has a lot of educational institutions including 7 primary schools, 2 high schools, a senior madrasa with some other madrasas. Such as:
Pirujali High School
Pirujali Adorsho High School
Pirujali Sishu kanon
Pirujali senior Madrasa, Shorkar para

Open Library: 
 Alokbortika Public Library

Notable residents
The union is known for being the burial place of popular writer Humayun Ahmed. Nuhash Polli is situated here. Humayun Ahmed built this Villa in 40 acres of land. He shot a large number of films and dramas here as a director. Without this Villa, there are a lot of shooting stops in this Union, including:
Priyo Ongon

References

Unions of Gazipur Sadar Upazila